Lucija Zaninović (born 26 June 1987, in Split) is a Croatian taekwondo practitioner. She is the twin sister of taekwondo practitioner Ana Zaninović.

Zaninović won the gold medal in the women's flyweight class at the 2010 European Taekwondo Championships held in Saint Petersburg. Zaninović qualified for the 2012 Summer Olympics after winning the silver medal in the women's 49 kg class at the 2011 World Taekwondo Olympic Qualification Tournament held in Baku. She withdrew in the final match against Olympic champion Wu Jingyu and was the only European to qualify through the Qualification Tournament. In 2012, she defended the European title in the women's flyweight class after defeating Kristina Kim at the 2012 European Taekwondo Championships held in Manchester. At the 2012 Summer Olympics, she defeated Seulki Kang and Carola Malvina López before losing to Wu Jingyu in the semi-finals. She won the bronze medal after defeating Jannet Alegría in the sudden death round of the bronze medal match. This was the third medal for Croatia at the Olympics in taekwondo, after Martina Zubčić and Sandra Šarić who also won the bronze four years before in Beijing.

References

External links

1987 births
Sportspeople from Split, Croatia
Croatian female taekwondo practitioners
Olympic taekwondo practitioners of Croatia
Taekwondo practitioners at the 2012 Summer Olympics
Taekwondo practitioners at the 2016 Summer Olympics
Olympic bronze medalists for Croatia
Living people
Croatian twins
Twin sportspeople
Olympic medalists in taekwondo
Medalists at the 2012 Summer Olympics
Taekwondo practitioners at the 2015 European Games
European Games medalists in taekwondo
European Games bronze medalists for Croatia
Universiade medalists in taekwondo
Universiade silver medalists for Croatia
World Taekwondo Championships medalists
European Taekwondo Championships medalists
Medalists at the 2015 Summer Universiade
21st-century Croatian women